Edmond De Schampheleer (21 July 1824, in Brussels – 12 March 1899, in Sint-Jans-Molenbeek) was a Belgian landscape painter and engraver.

Biography
After completing his studies with Eugène-François de Block in Antwerp, he set himself up as a landscape painter; taking a realistic approach, derived from Théodore Fourmois and the French artists of the Barbizon School. He also combined plein aire techniques with large-scale painting in his studio.

He undertook a number of journeys in search of motifs; visiting Bavaria, the Netherlands and France, where he associated with the artists in Barbizon. It would appear, however, that his favorite area was  Oosterbeek in Gelderland; a site where many painters congregated. His style increasingly came to resemble that of the 17th century Dutch artists. He also liked to paint in the vicinity of Genk.

He was a close friend of the animal painter, . His students included Clemens Van den Broeck (1843-1922) and Euphrosine Beernaert. The works of Louis Pulinckx (1843-1910) display his influence.

Later, he was also one of the illustrators for De Coster's Les Légendes Flamandes.

In 1869, he was named a Knight in the Order of Leopold.

Sources
  Patrick & Viviane Berko, Dictionnaire des peintres belges nés entre 1750 et 1875, Laconti, Brussels, 1981
  Willem Flippo, Lexicon of the Belgian Romantic Painters, Ruygrok, Antwerp, 1981
  Norbert Hostyn, "Edmond De Schampheleer", in: Nationaal Biografisch Woordenboek, vol.14, Koninklijke Vlaamse Academie, 1992.
  Wim & Greet Pas, Biografisch Lexicon Plastische Kunst in België. Schilders- beeldhouwers grafici 1830-2000, Arto, 2000 
  Paul Piron, Dictionnaire des artistes plasticiens de Belgique des XIXe et XXe siècles, Lasne, 2003 
  Kristof Reulens, et al., Genk door schildersogen. Landschapsschilders in de Limburgse Kempen 1850-1950, Davidsfonds, 2010

External links

 More works by De Schampheleer @ ArtNet

1824 births
1899 deaths
Belgian painters
Belgian landscape painters
Artists from Brussels